TLC is a Polish pay television channel which broadcasts lifestyle-centred television series. It targets mature women and broadcasts programmes related to lifestyle, health, food, and more.

The channel was launched on 15 September 2009 by Discovery Networks Central Europe as the local version of Discovery Travel & Living. It replaced the Pan-European version of the channel, which had been available in Poland since 1999. Unlike the Pan-European version, the Polish channel offers advertising. The channel has 3.6 million subscribers. On 1 October 2010, Discovery Travel & Living Poland became TLC, as part of Discovery's rebranding plan of most of its Discovery Travel & Living channels worldwide.

On 18 August, a block of programmes from the Oprah Winfrey Network (OWN) was launched on TLC Poland, making Poland the first country in central and eastern Europe to receive OWN programming.

See also
TLC (TV network)

References

Poland
Television channels in Poland
Television channels and stations established in 2009
2009 establishments in Poland

pl:TLC (stacja telewizyjna)